is a 2018 Japanese animated drama film directed by Naoko Yamada and written by Reiko Yoshida, based on the Sound! Euphonium novel series written by Ayano Takeda and its eponymous anime television series adaptation by Yamada and Tatsuya Ishihara. Inspired in particular by the 2017 Sound! Euphonium novel Hibike! Yūfoniamu Kitauji Kōkō Suisōgaku-bu, Haran no Dainigakushō Kōhen, the film is a spin-off sequel to the television series, focusing on the friendship of Mizore Yoroizuka and Nozomi Kasaki, two supporting characters introduced during the series' second season. It is intended as a standalone work that can be fully understood without prior knowledge of the series. 

The film focuses on the relationship between Mizore and Nozomi as they prepare for a concert with their high school's wind band; in parallel, it also depicts a fairy tale, from which the music piece worked on by the band is adapted, as a story within a story. Atsumi Tanezaki and Nao Tōyama, among others, reprise their voice roles as characters from the television series; most of them were re-designed to better fit the film's style and story. Liz and the Blue Bird had two composers: Kensuke Ushio, who wrote the minimal-style background music for the high school scenes, and Akito Matsuda, the composer of the television series, who wrote both the background music for the fairy tale segments, and the concert pieces performed by the characters.

It was released on April 21, 2018 in Japan, and had a limited release on November 9, 2018 in the United States. It received positive reviews from critics, with most praise going to the relationship and personalities of the two main characters, soundtrack, and animation.

Plot 
Mizore is a quiet, introverted student in her third and final year of high school, who is an oboist in the school's concert band. Her closest friend, who occupies most of her thoughts, is Nozomi, one of the band's flutists, who is much more outgoing and popular. Together, the two rehearse a duet from the musical piece Liz and the Blue Bird, which is based on an eponymous, fictional German fairy tale that Nozomi loved as a child. The story is about a young woman named Liz (represented by the oboe in the musical piece) and an unnamed blue bird turned human (represented by the flute) who become best friends and live together, until the two are forced to part ways. Nozomi and Mizore realize that the story applies closely to their own relationship and impending graduation, which worries Mizore; she sees herself as Liz and Nozomi as the fleeting blue bird.

Although Nozomi spends time with other friends from the band, Mizore keeps herself isolated from everyone except Nozomi, and refuses her other bandmates' offers to spend time together. She often tries to express her affection to Nozomi, but finds herself unable to. Niiyama, the band's woodwind instructor, advises Mizore to apply to a music school after graduation so that she can become a professional musician; she is not particularly interested at first, but changes her mind after Nozomi says that she might apply to the same school. This worries their bandmates, as they realize that Mizore's only motivation for playing music is Nozomi, who is not truly serious about becoming a professional.

As the concert approaches, Mizore and Nozomi grow apart. Mizore, anxious about her future and recalling that Nozomi quit the band two years prior, is afraid that she is abandoning her again. Meanwhile, Nozomi is uncomfortable with Mizore progressively opening herself to others and being tutored by Niiyama, envious of her greater potential. Furthermore, the two have trouble perfecting their duet, both because of their increasingly strained relationship and because of their difficulty connecting with the characters from Liz and the Blue Bird; Mizore, in particular, does not understand why Liz would ever let the blue bird go free instead of keeping it with her forever.

Eventually, the two come to a greater understanding of their relationship, thanks to the assistance of Niiyama and other members of the band. They ultimately come to realize that, while they associated Mizore to Liz and Nozomi to the blue bird, Mizore is actually closer to the blue bird—having to let go of her unconditional attachment so she can live her own life—while Nozomi is closer to Liz, who let the bird go free so that she would not weigh it down. At the next rehearsal, they perform the piece perfectly. Mizore's performance moves her bandmates, and Nozomi exits the practice room in tears. Mizore confronts Nozomi privately afterwards; Nozomi confesses that she knew Mizore was holding back her talent for her sake. She also explains that she didn't intend on applying for music school, and had only said so out of envy for Mizore's talent, because she knew that she didn't have the necessary skill to be accepted. Mizore, upset that Nozomi is seemingly ignoring her feelings and leaving her behind, hugs Nozomi and confesses the true extent of her love. However, Nozomi only laughs, knowing that accepting Mizore's feelings would only continue to confine her.

Some time later, Mizore and Nozomi are seemingly still distant from each other, with Nozomi prioritizing her entrance exams over the band. After they meet in the school's library, Nozomi asks Mizore to join her at a café after school. On the way, she says that she will back up Mizore perfectly in their duet, only asking for "a little time". Mizore answers that she will continue to play the oboe. As the two walk together, Nozomi suddenly turns to Mizore, causing Mizore to look surprised.

Voice cast 

 Atsumi Tanezaki (Japanese) / Laurie Hymes (English) as Mizore Yoroizuka, an introverted third-year high school student and oboist in the concert band
 Nao Tōyama (Japanese) / Stephanie Sheh (English) as Nozomi Kasaki, a third-year flutist in the band and Mizore's more outgoing friend
 Miyu Honda (Japanese) / Courtney Shaw (English) as both Liz and the Mysterious Girl, the main characters of the Liz and the Blue Bird fairy tale
 Konomi Fujimura (Japanese) / Sarah Anne Williams (English) as Natsuki Nakagawa, a third-year euphoniumist and the vice-president of the band
 Yuri Yamaoka (Japanese) / Megan Harvey (English) as Yuuko Yoshikawa, a third-year trumpeter and the president of the band
 Shiori Sugiura (Japanese) / Xanthe Huynh (English) as Ririka Kenzaki, a first-year oboist in the band
 Chika Anzai (Japanese) / Cristina Vee (English) as Reina Kousaka, a second-year trumpeter in the band
 Tomoyo Kurosawa (Japanese) / Courtney Shaw (English) as Kumiko Oumae, a second-year euphoniumist in the band
 Ayaka Asai (Japanese) / Alyson Leigh Rosenfeld (English) as Hazuki Katou, a second-year tubaist in the band
 Moe Toyota (Japanese) / Cassandra Lee Morris (English) as Sapphire Kawashima, a second-year bassist in the band
 Houko Kuwashima (Japanese) / Ryan Bartley (English) as Satomi Niiyama, the band's woodwind instructor
 Yuichi Nakamura (Japanese) / Mike Pollock (English) as Masahiro Hashimoto, the band's percussion instructor
 Takahiro Sakurai (Japanese) / Wayne Grayson (English) as Noboru Taki, the band's music director

Production 
Liz and the Blue Bird is the third film based on Sound! Euphonium, following Sound! Euphonium: The Movie - Welcome to the Kitauji High School Concert Band and Sound! Euphonium: Todoketai Melody, both of which were abridged adaptations of the anime. However, the movie takes place within the universe of the television series, in which Mizore and Nozomi appear as supporting characters; conversely, main characters in the series such as Kumiko and Reina only appear in supporting roles. Despite being a spin-off, the film is also meant to work as an independent story, and does not require knowledge of Sound! Euphonium. Character designer Futoshi Nishiya re-designed the characters instead of using the designs from the series, in order to better fit the film's style, story and themes. The crew also included Mutsuo Shinohara as art director, and Naomi Ishida as color stylist.  Stephanie Sheh served as casting director and ADR director for the film's English release.

Yamada originally discovered the characters of Mizore and Nozomi when they were introduced in the second of Takeda's novels, Sound! Euphonium 2: The Hottest Summer of Kitauji High School's Wind Ensemble Club. She stated: "I was moved by the focus [Takeda] placed on developing new characters in that section of the story, and remember becoming captivated with the relationship of Mizore and Nozomi. At the same time, I thought it was a terribly sinful story. And yet so very transparent and rash... At any rate, I thought it was fascinating. I can definitively not come up with this kind of perspective by myself. Since I liked it so much, the two have since been on my mind." Yamada had worked as storyboard artist and occasional director for the anime series; at the time, Takeda was working on a two-part sequel to the Sound! Euphonium novels that would be published as two different novels (Hibike! Yūfoniamu Kitauji Kōkō Suisōgaku-bu, Haran no Dainigakushō): the first, Zenpen, would be focused on Kumiko, and the second one, Kōhen, on Mizore and her relationship with Nozomi. The series' crew read the novels before they were published in order to prepare a potential film adaptation; as it would have been difficult to properly depict both Mizore and Nozomi's stories within the same film, the team decided to make two different films instead, with Yamada directing Mizore and Nozomi's because of her "increasing interest in them", and Tatsuya Ishihara, the main director of the series, directing Zenpen, which would be titled Sound! Euphonium the Movie: Oath's Finale and would be released the following year.

Yamada stated about the making of the film: "My first thought was to put my impression of Nozomi and Mizore's story into something visual. Then, when pulling myself right up-close to the problems and growth the two girls experience, I made sure to catch any small changes or realisations the two may have. I wanted this film to be in its most suitable form to match what this story wanted to depict. [...]  I wanted to catch and depict these softer, more subtle aspects. For example, even the slightest aversion of their eyes is something born from their thoughts and feelings. This is something I wanted to take great care of – I wanted to make sure I didn't lose any of it. It's like watching and quietly holding your breath, recording what you see. Like watching the girls behind a pane of glass; a single touch enough to make them disappear. I put importance in using colour to reflect this sense of fragility and fleetingness. [...] For this piece of work subtle emotions and the buildup of feeling was important. So I was careful as to not add acting that was formulaic, like 'they're sad so they'll make a sad face'. For example, the flautist Nozomi. When she lifts the corners of her mouth and narrows her eyes, it is recognised by the other that she is smiling. She's the sort of girl who thinks like this, but looking at it the other way, by ‘smiling’ she's maintaining the distance between her and the other. It was important to not take shortcuts in depiction, as to protect the dignity of these girls who live their lives thinking about this with every step they take."

Nozomi's voice actress Nao Tōyama stated that Yamada told her that "Mizore's feelings towards Nozomi and Nozomi's feelings towards Mizore aren’t the same. Both care about each other, but their feelings grow apart. They feel empathy for each other, but their relationship is special and unusual." Yamada also stated in another interview that she "had a very hard time depicting the intricacies of the relation between Mizore and Nozomi. It seemed like one would get a completely different impression by just the way they ended their words in every bit of their conversations. I absolutely wanted to be faithful to the feelings of the two. It was a very risky speech style we went for, however we did not intend to make something where the people we show it to simple-mindedly sees them as "very good friends". In order to protect dignity, so that there was not any falsehood (in the drawings), I was constantly careful not to make it showy."

Tōyama stated "Nozomi was depicted in the TV series as a truly nice, cheerful person loved by everyone. I tried to render her charisma, not just her motivated and driven personality. However, in the movie, she shows her imperfections, which weren't depicted in the TV series due to her not being the main character. For instance, she can be cunning and jealous of even Mizore, who she really cares about. I think viewers of the movie will feel an affinity with her human side. To be honest, I was confused when I read the script at first. I didn't want to destroy the fans’ image of her from Sound! Euphonium, even though the movie is a completely new story. I hope viewers understand that Nozomi is the same girl from the TV series, and the movie shows different aspects of her not shown before.  I'd like to portray her without destroying her image, but surprise viewers with her human side. To be honest, I felt that I could relate to Mizore more than Nozomi at first. I understood Mizore's feelings but not Nozomi's. I didn't understand her looking away or shuffling her feet at the crucial time. I thought she wasn't the girl who I knew well. It took a while for me to understand why she acted like that. She has too much on her mind and can't handle her emotions anymore. On the other hand, Mizore stays the same in the movie, so it's easy to understand her."

Mizore's voice actress Atsumi Tanezaki stated: "There was no confusion about Mizore's role. How she treasures being with Nozomi hasn't changed a bit from the TV series. However, there were very few scenes of the two together in the TV series. There were only the scenes of them making up and then a few conversations. Therefore, I wondered how I could render her feelings when they were chatting and joking around or playing together in the sun. The director told me that Mizore feels like it's the last chance to be with Nozomi every time she meets her. She always feels insecure about her friendship with Nozomi and fears it'll end abruptly without warning. I understood those feelings towards her during the TV series, so I told her ‘I know. I get it.’ Mizore treasures every moment with Nozomi and was simply happy when Nozomi reacts to her joke by saying, ‘What's that?’ She hasn't changed in that respect."

Both Tōyama and Tanezaki pointed at the importance of Mizore always walking behind Nozomi rather than next to her. Tōyama stated: "Viewers see them from the lateral view, however, from Mizore's perspective, she is always watching Nozomi's back. When Mizore becomes an adult and looks back on her teenage years, she probably remembers Nozomi's back. I become emotional just thinking about that."

Music 
Liz and the Blue Bird had two composers: Kensuke Ushio, who had scored Yamada's previous film A Silent Voice, composed the minimal-styled background music for the scenes in high school, while the background music for the Liz and the Blue Bird fairy tale segments and the concert pieces performed by the characters' wind band were composed and conducted by Akito Matsuda, the composer of the Sound! Euphonium anime series. The soundtrack was composed beforehand, and the keyframe animation done afterwards to match with it; the scenes featuring Ushio's music were particularly hard to animate, as he included the sounds of the characters' footsteps as part of the music, and their movements had to be perfectly synchronized with the sounds; the goal was to have "visuals, music, and the sounds of footsteps in complete tandem".

Unlike A Silent Voice which he joined late during production, Ushio was involved since very early in Liz and the Blue Birds production, and as such helped Yamada develop her own ideas for the film; he stated: "When I read the script, I thought this was a very personal story; a story that should remain hidden from everyone else. If such adolescent feelings, so very delicate like glass, were to be known to others, I think that those girls would truly become unable to build connections with others later in life. So I wanted the music to be like holding your breath, secretly watching. There's also the fantastic wind band music that Matsuda composed. I thought this music was what you should find yourself humming after watching the film, so I tried to make sure I didn't bring the melody out too much in the film music. That's why I decided to go with this unconventional method of composition."

To record the soundtrack, Ushio and Yamada went to the real-life school the building in the film is based on, where Ushio recorded himself tapping and using the present objects in different ways, and later included those sounds in the soundtrack; he later remembered that Yamada "couldn't stop laughing" while he recorded. To compose, Ushio used a method Yamada qualified as "decalcomania", spilling ink on sheet music and folding it before putting the end result into music. He described it as "a way of representing how the two girls, that sort of disjoint between them and that gradual separation. We took that and used that as the base for the soundtrack as well so that's one of the reasons why it ended up with such a nostalgic tone to it. Within the decalcomania you'll see different objects, the beaker, the piano, the desk scraping sound. For example, the footsteps are synchronized to the music. The footsteps had an actual tempo. The tempo is 99, 100, 101. These are coprime numbers. The footsteps' tempo is always a coprime number but we also slightly moved the tempo because we are humans and not robots. So at the very end of this film, you saw the happy on screen situation - I cannot remember the tone but the footsteps are completely synced. Just the footsteps. So something that happened that even I didn't expect is the footsteps ended up in sync together and for them they never expected that. It felt like a genuine miracle that that happened. It was a joint moment." He also composed some of the soundtrack in a more conventional manner.

Talking about the recording of the "Liz and the Blue Bird" piece, Yamada stated "The live performance was just so warm... And I could feel a sense of space. Sometimes [the oboist and the flutist] would take a deep breath and at others they would sing out with their instruments. My chest felt tight listening to such a performance filled with so much emotion. The two of them listened to me so attentively, I ended up feeling too comfortable and talked much more than I had meant to. As these two were musicians and not actors I thought it would be best if I talked in specifics like 'play the first two notes then stop'. But in reality they really managed to get on board emotionally and did a great deal of acting. For example there's a moment where Nozomi doesn't want to lose but just can't fight back. They had really broken down and understood this moment, so the expression in the music was so good. The animation can't lose to this, I thought. It really made me excited."

The crew also included Saito Shigeru as music producer, Yôta Tsuruoka as sound director, and Oowara Masahiro as supervising director of the wind band. The band Homecomings provided the theme song for the film, "Songbirds", which is the second song heard during the end credits. The end credits also start with a second original song titled "Girls, Dance, Staircase", composed by Ushio with lyrics by Yamada, although Ushio "added a few words so that they would fit with the music in a more interesting way". At Yamada's idea, the song was sung by a boy soprano, which Ushio called "a brilliant idea. The boy soprano has this feeling of not being distinctly male or female which I guess really fits in with the film's mix of the subjective and objective." Commenting on how he composed the song, Ushio stated that "whilst the song sounds holy, it should also express the more personal and private aspects of a girl. Getting this balance right was very difficult. The piece should have elements of religious music without being too much like a religious piece, so it was very much like threading a needle."

Release 
The film was released in Japan on April 21, 2018 by Shochiku. Eleven Arts released the film the United States on November 9, 2018. It premiered in Canada on January 2, 2019.

The fil, was later released on Blu-ray and DVD on December 5, 2018 in Japan. Eleven Arts later announced Shout! Factory, who is best known for releasing Super Sentai media in North America would be releasing Liz and the Blue Bird on home video in the region on March 5, 2019.

Reception

Critical reception 
Liz and the Blue Bird received positive reviews from critics, with most praise going to the relationship and personalities of the two main characters, soundtrack, and animation. On Metacritic, which assigns a weighted average rating, the film has a score of 67 out of 100 based on 5 critics, indicating "generally favorable reviews".

Natasha H. of IGN gave a highly positive review, stating: that Yamada goes "full out with her own style and approach to constructing an experience of loneliness, misperceptions of people, and overcoming unrealistic dreams. She does this in one of the most unique and extraordinary methods I've seen in this medium: by pairing her framing and pacing of the story right up with the soundtrack. It is almost impossible to decouple the visual and auditory experiences of Liz and the Blue Bird [...] The soft character designs also lend to emotional expressions, which aligns perfectly with the kind of people Mizore and Nozomi are. Whether it's the eyes, or slant of the mouth, or even the criss crossing of legs - the attention to detail shows in every frame of the film. The music is also very particular, as Ushio weaves instruments familiar and strange together into a sparse and discreet score to portray the mindset of the main two characters and atmosphere of each scene in the film." She gave the film a 9 out of 10 rating, concluding: "Liz and the Blue Bird, while seemingly straightforward and simple, is one of the most structurally complex films about the necessity of communication for healthy relationships. It displays human insecurity and vulnerability in beautifully honest ways, and thanks to the combined craft of director Yamada's impeccable vision and composer Ushio's sparse but minimalistic soundtrack, it ends up becoming one of the most touching and moving experiences I've seen this year."

Matt Schley of The Japan Times gave the film a 4.5 out of 5 rating, calling it "brilliantly executed" and stating "Not everyone has been in a wind band, but there are few among us who have never had to say goodbye to a friend. For Sound! Euphonium fans, Liz will be a welcome trip back into its world, but this film will resonate just as strongly with anyone who's ever been through the emotional roller coaster known as high school." Writing for The Daily Dot, Michelle Jarowski gave the film a 4 out of 5 rating, stating "Liz and the Blue Bird soars from the get-go as it weaves together a fantastical fairy tale and a more intimate, relatable high school story. As two sides of the same coin, both stories circle one another until they fuse into a poignant harmony of sight and sound."

Jordan Mintzer of The Hollywood Reporter gave a moderately positive review, unfavourably comparing the film to Yamada's previous work A Silent Voice. He stated: "Despite the way Yamada keeps reiterating how delicate teenage relationships can be, and how easily they can slip away when you move on to the next stage of your life, the story's limited setting and lack of overt drama makes her movie feel somewhat uneventful. It seems closer, at times, to an after-school special — or to an episode of Degrassi Junior High — than to a full-fledged feature, even if a late twist gives everything more gravitas. Aesthetically speaking, there are nonetheless some beautiful moments scattered throughout the story, with the animation switching seamlessly between the detailed manga-style drawings of the classroom scenes and the more ephemeral watercolor renderings of the fairy tale sequences. Like in A Silent Voice, Yamada has a very keen eye for depicting adolescent malaise in visually evocative terms, and Liz and the Blue Bird could have benefited from even more flights of fancy than she allows for here."

Box office  

Liz and the Blue Bird grossed $737,286 at the box office.

Accolades 
The film won the Ofuji Noburo Award. It was also nominated for the Animat's Award for Best Feature-Length Film at the Sitges Film Festival in Spain; in America, it was nominated for a Satellite Award for Best Animated or Mixed Media Feature.

Follow-up film 
Another Sound! Euphonium film titled Sound! Euphonium The Movie - Our Promise: A Brand New Day, based on Zenpen, the other Hibike! Yūfoniamu Kitauji Kōkō Suisōgaku-bu, Haran no Dainigakushō novel, was released on April 19, 2019; it is directed by Tatsuya Ishihara and written by Jukki Hanada, respectively the television series' main director and sole writer. Its production took place concurrently with Liz and the Blue Birds; it focuses on Kumiko, the main character of the novels who appears in Liz in a supporting role, and is "connected" to Liz. Yamada stated that the "Liz and the Blue Bird" music piece featured in her film "will be connecting the film to [the second one]." The film was released in North America on July 11, 2019 (sub) and July 15, 2019 (dub).

References

External links

  
 
 
 
 
 

2018 anime films
Animated drama films
Films directed by Naoko Yamada
Animated films based on animated series
Films based on Japanese novels
Kyoto Animation
Music in anime and manga
School life in anime and manga
2018 drama films

ja:リズと青い鳥